Robert Kozluk (born 5 August 1977) is an English former footballer who played primarily as a right-back.

Born in Mansfield he came through the Derby County youth-team ranks before turning professional in 1997 before joining Sheffield United in March 1999. He spent eight years with the Blades, and made close to 250 appearances for the club, helping them to the Premier League at the end of the 2005–06 season. A three-year spell at Barnsley followed after which he returned to Sheffield United for a further season although by this time was a rarely used squad player. He joined Port Vale on a short-term deal in September 2011, before signing with Bradford City for the remainder of the season in January 2012. He joined Ilkeston in January 2013, and retired in October of that year.

Kozluk has also had loan spells at Huddersfield Town in 2000, Preston North End in 2005 and seventeen days on loan at Wigan Athletic in 2001 where he failed to make a single first team appearance. He was also capped twice for the England under-21s.

Club career

Derby County
Kozluk started his career at Premier League Derby County, where he made his debut in the League Cup on 16 September 1997, playing the full ninety minutes of a 1–0 win over Southend United at Roots Hall. The following month he won a second start, helping the club to beat Tottenham Hotspur 2–1 at White Hart Lane in the next round of the competition. He made his league debut at Anfield on 25 October, in what ended as a 4–0 win for Liverpool. He played four games in November, starting with a 3–0 win over Arsenal and ending with a 4–0 defeat to Chelsea at Stamford Bridge. In all he made twelve appearances in 1997–98.

He was in and out of the first team in 1998–99, and made ten appearances, seven of which were in the Premiership, before his transfer in March 1999.

Sheffield United
In March 1999 Kozluk signed for Sheffield United, as part of a swap deal that took Vassilios Borbokis to Derby and made his United debut in a 3–2 defeat to Tranmere Rovers at Prenton Park.

The following season, retaining his first team place under new manager Neil Warnock, Kozluk made 43 appearances, however at the start of the 2000–01 campaign he joined First Division rivals Huddersfield Town on a three-month loan deal. Having made fourteen appearances for the Terriers he returned to Sheffield United where he managed to win back his first team spot and played regularly until the end of the season.

In September 2001 Kozluk again left Bramall Lane on loan, though this time he would not make it onto the pitch for Second Division side Wigan Athletic. He returned to the Blades but found himself out of favour, playing just nine games during the 2001–02 season. Back in the first team in 2002–03, he played 35 league games scoring his first-ever senior goal with a thirty-yard strike against Grimsby Town on 4 March. United went on to have a memorable season as they pushed for promotion to the Premier League and reached the latter stages of both major cup competitions. Kozluk appeared in the play-off Final at the Millennium Stadium, where United lost 3–0 to Wolves. and played in the club's FA Cup semi-final defeat to eventual winners Arsenal.

Kozluk made a total of 47 appearances in 2003–04, as the Blades recorded an eighth-place finish, during which he also scored the second goal of his career when he knocked one past Stoke City's Ed de Goey at the Britannia Stadium on 1 November. Injuries at the start of the season meant that Kozluk lost his place in the first team missed the whole first half of the 2004–05 campaign, the inaugural season of the Championship. He was allowed to join Championship rivals Preston North End on a one-month loan in January 2005 where he played in one FA Cup and one league games for the Lilywhites before returning to Bramall Lane where he played a further nine games before the end of the season.

United finally won promotion to the Premier League in the 2005–06 season, finishing runners up in the Championship, during which Kozluk played 27 league games. A further 20 first team appearances followed in the top flight the following season but the club failed to consolidate their top-flight status and were relegated in a final day show-down with Wigan Athletic. With the club looking to rebuild and cut costs Kozluk was released by United at the end of the season. At the time of his departure he was United's longest serving player, having made 236 league and cup appearances for the club.

Barnsley
In July 2007, Kozluk turned down a contract at Sheffield United and Leeds United to sign for Championship side Barnsley, after manager Simon Davey offered him the highest wages at the club. The club described the signing as a 'massive coup'. Helping the club to avoid relegation by the end of the 2007–08 season, he also played a role in the club reaching the FA Cup FA Cup semi-finals, helping the Tykes to overcome Liverpool at Anfield, and Chelsea at Oakwell, before ultimately losing 1–0 to Cardiff City in the semi-finals at Wembley.

Kozluk was used on the left side of defence in the 2008–09 campaign, and recorded a total of 38 appearances throughout the season. However he failed to hold down a first team place in 2009–10, and missed the last few months of the season with a knee injury. With his contract expiring and the club looking to reduce the wage bill he was released by Barnsley in June 2010.

Return to Sheffield United
In July 2010, Kozluk signed for Sheffield United for the second time on a one-year deal. Signed as a squad player he made little impact on the Blades first team until he was given a run of games by new manager Micky Adams in January. In his second start of the season he scored with a late volley against local rivals Doncaster Rovers to earn United a 2–2 draw. This was only his third career goal, and his first-ever goal at Bramall Lane in his two spells with the club. At the end of the campaign he was offered a new contract by Adams' replacement, Danny Wilson, however he turned down the offer in the hope of finding a new club.

Port Vale
Kozluk spent September 2011 training at Burton Albion whilst considering his options, before rejoining his former boss Micky Adams at League Two club Port Vale on 22 September, signing a short-term contract until 1 January 2012. This was the first time the 34-year-old would play outside of the top two tiers of English football and he faced competition for the right-back slot from Adam Yates. Having been limited to just seven appearances during his stay at Vale Park, Kozluk departed in search of a new club two days before Christmas.

Bradford City
On 11 January 2012, Bradford City signed Kozluk on a contract lasting until the end of the 2011–12 season, as manager Phil Parkinson looked to use Kozluk as cover for an injured Simon Ramsden. He made his debut on 14 January in a 2–2 home draw with Morecambe, but Kozluk was released from Bradford in May 2012 after being told his contract would not be renewed. Parkison told the press that he was looking for a younger full-back, though did not rule out re-signing Kozluk as emergency cover.

Ilkeston
Kozluk joined Northern Premier League side Ilkeston as a player-coach in January 2013, dropping outside of the English Football League for the first time. Manager Kevin Wilson said: "Although Rob has not been playing this season, he has been training regularly with Chesterfield and, in my opinion, he is still more than capable of doing a job for a Football League club. He has vast experience with more than 300 League games at a high level, and that's a commodity that we feel we're a bit short of at the moment. Obviously his ability to play in numerous positions will also be a big asset." The club finished 12th in 2012–13, and Kozluk retired in October 2013 to concentrate on a coaching role at the club.

International career
Kozluk gained two caps for the England under 21s in summer 1998, where he played in the Toulon Tournament alongside Frank Lampard and Emile Heskey.

Career statistics

Honours
Sheffield United
Championship second-place promotion: 2005–06

References

1977 births
Living people
Footballers from Mansfield
English footballers
England under-21 international footballers
Association football defenders
Derby County F.C. players
Sheffield United F.C. players
Huddersfield Town A.F.C. players
Wigan Athletic F.C. players
Preston North End F.C. players
Barnsley F.C. players
Port Vale F.C. players
Bradford City A.F.C. players
Ilkeston F.C. players
Premier League players
English Football League players
Northern Premier League players
Association football coaches